Tarare is an opéra (tragédie lyrique) composed by Antonio Salieri to a French libretto by Pierre Beaumarchais. It was first performed by the Paris Opera at the Théâtre de la Porte Saint-Martin on 8 June 1787. Salieri also reworked the material into an Italian version retitled Axur, re d'Ormus with libretto by Lorenzo Da Ponte, which opened in Vienna in January 1788.

Roles

Discography
Cyrile Dubois, Tarare and ombre de Tarare, Karine Deshayes, Astasie and ombre de Astasie, Jean-Sébastien Bou, Atar and ombre d'Atar, Judith van Wanroij, La Nature and Spinette, Les Chantres du Centre de Musique Baroque de Versailles, Les Talens Lyriques, conducted by Christophe Rousset. Aparté 2019.

References

Notes

Sources
 Original libretto: Tarare, Opéra en cinq actes, avec un prologue; Représenté, pour la première fois, sur le Théâtre de l'Académie Royale de Musique, le vendredi 8 Juin 1787, Paris: Delormel, 1787 (accessible for free online at books.google)
 Georges d'Heylli & Fernand de Marescot (editors), Théâtre complet de Beaumarchais. Réimpression des éd. princeps, avec les variantes des ms originaux ..., Paris: Académie des bibliophiles, 1869–1871, IV, pp. 1–171 (accessible for free online at Gallica, Bibliothèque Nationale de France)
 Francesco Blanchetti, Tarare, in Piero Gelli and Filippo Poletti (editors),  Dizionario dell'opera 2008, Milan, Baldini Castoldi Dalai, 2007, pp. 1259–1260,  (reproduced online at Opera Manager)

External links

 Score, University of North Texas Music Library
 

Operas
1787 operas
French-language operas
Operas by Antonio Salieri
Opera world premieres at the Paris Opera